Ada Vidovič Muha (born March 8, 1940) is a Slovene linguist. She is an emeritus professor who has many books published on the linguistics of Slovene.

Life
Muha was born in Pivka in 1940. In 1963 she graduated from the Faculty of Arts in Ljubljana after studying Slovene and the Serbo-Croatian language in literature. After graduation, she studied at Charles University in Prague.  She received her master's degree from the Faculty of Arts in Ljubljana in 1979 on "the syntactic role of the adjective word" and she became an assistant Professor. In 1984 she gained a doctorate in linguistic sciences.

She taught at the Fran Ramovš Institute and then later at the Faculty of Arts in Ljubljana. She received her master's degree from the Faculty of Arts in Ljubljana in 1979 on "the syntactic role of the adjective word".

In 2000 she published a reference book, Slovensko leksikalno pomenoslovje: govorica slovarja, on the semantic of Slovenian.

References

1940 births
Living people
Women linguists
People from the Municipality of Pivka
Linguists from Slovenia